Paul Is Live is a live album by Paul McCartney, released in 1993 during his New World Tour in support of his studio album Off the Ground, released that same year. Paul Is Live contains live recordings of McCartney and his touring band—which at the time included his then-wife Linda and guitarist Robbie McIntosh—performing songs by McCartney's former bands The Beatles and Wings, as well as songs from his solo career. The tracks included on the album were recorded at various concerts during his New World Tour, in several American cities and in Australia.

The title of Paul Is Live is a reference to the "Paul is dead" conspiracy theory, and the album's cover artwork, which is based on that of the Beatles' 1969 album Abbey Road, contains multiple references to the theory. Paul Is Live was McCartney's last live album for nine years, until the release of the double live album Back in the U.S. (North America Only. Back In the World everywhere else), which coincided with his 2002 Driving World Tour.

Title and cover
The album's title is a response to the "Paul is dead" rumours after the 1969 release of the Beatles' penultimate studio album, Abbey Road. The photograph used for the cover is from the same August 1969 photo session as the photo used for the Abbey Road album cover, with some digital manipulation. Differences between the two photos include different people and vehicles in the background, and on the "Abbey Road" cover, George Harrison is partly obscuring the left rear corner of the white Volkswagen with the infamous number plate, which is parked half up on the kerb on the left, whereas the cover of "Paul Is Live" gives a clear view of the Volkswagen.

Apart from these, intentional differences between the two are:
 The "LMW281F" on the Volkswagen Beetle's number plate – which was mis-read as "LMW28IF", purportedly meaning that McCartney would have been 28 if he had lived (he was actually 27 when Abbey Road was made, not 28) – is edited to read "51IS", indicating that he is alive and his age at the time was 51.
 McCartney is wearing shoes; on Abbey Road he had appeared with bare feet, while the other Beatles had shoes. This mismatch was viewed as an eyecatch to the hoax.
 McCartney is putting his left foot forward; on Abbey Road he is seen with his right foot forward, out of step with the others, and this was purportedly meant to symbolise his being on a different plane of existence.
 McCartney, who is left-handed, is seen holding a cigarette with his right hand on Abbey Road, supporting the idea that it was an imposter; in this cover, McCartney is holding the dog leash with his left hand.

The dog featured on the cover is an Old English Sheepdog McCartney owned named Arrow.  Arrow was the offspring of McCartney's pet Martha, inspiration for the Beatles 1968 song "Martha My Dear".

Release

Excerpted from his shows in Australia, as well as from various cities in the United States, Paul Is Live followed the 1989–90 Paul McCartney World Tour/Tripping the Live Fantastic extravaganza by only three years, confounding critics and fans as to its appearance, and in some cases its necessity (although the only song it has in common with Tripping the Live Fantastic is "Live And Let Die"). As a result, Paul Is Live became McCartney's lowest-selling live set of his career, peaking at number 34 in the UK and number 78 in the US.

A concert film subtitled The New World Tour was subsequently released on VHS, and later on DVD. It was directed by Aubrey Powell. The video release includes the controversial pre-concert film, which features vintage footage of the Beatles, solo-era live footage of "Maybe I'm Amazed" and "Bluebird" from the Rockshow film, then switches tone by including graphic animal test footage (all of which is underscored by "Live And Let Die" and "Helter Skelter"), and, finally, warmup footage of the band.  The program starts with the warm-up footage, and is played in full at the conclusion of the concert. The packaging included a disclaimer warning regarding the graphic nature of the animal footage.

Afterwards, McCartney took an extended break from his solo career to begin the Beatles Anthology project in early 1994 with George Harrison, Ringo Starr and George Martin. This took up much of his time for the next two years, before Flaming Pie in 1997.

Reception

Stephen Thomas Erlewine, in a review of the album for AllMusic, called its tracks "competent but utterly unnecessary", and writing that, "it smacks of overkill to release this record, which has the exact same band and tone as Tripping the Live Fantastic." Conversely, Tom Sinclair of Entertainment Weekly wrote that "the most appealing thing about Paul Is Live is the spontaneity of the old boy's performances. What could easily have been a schmaltz revue sounds like 77 minutes of unpretentious rock & roll".

Reviewing the concert film, Entertainment Weeklys Ron Giver wrote: "The appeal of McCartney's rather restrained delivery is undercut, however, by the deadening way in which shots from different performances of the same song have been edited together into a hyperkinetic montage-and the airless way in which crowd noise has been eliminated."

Track listing

Album

Notes
 "Robbie's Bit (Thanks Chet)" is a solo performance by guitarist Robbie McIntosh, "inspired by Chet Atkins".
 Tracks 5, 8, 9, and 24 were recorded at Giants Stadium, East Rutherford, New Jersey, on 11 June 1993; they are described on the vinyl, CD, and digital releases of the album as having been recorded "Live in New York".

Video release
"Drive My Car" (Lennon–McCartney)
"Let Me Roll It" (P. McCartney, L. McCartney)
"Looking for Changes"
"Peace in the Neighbourhood"
"All My Loving" (Lennon–McCartney)
"Good Rocking Tonight" (Brown)
"We Can Work It Out" (Lennon–McCartney)
"Hope of Deliverance"
"Michelle" (Lennon–McCartney)
"Biker Like an Icon"
"Here, There and Everywhere" (Lennon–McCartney)
"Magical Mystery Tour" (Lennon–McCartney)
"C'Mon People"
"Lady Madonna" (Lennon–McCartney)
"Paperback Writer" (Lennon–McCartney)
"Penny Lane" (Lennon–McCartney)
"Live and Let Die" (P. McCartney, L. McCartney)
"Kansas City" (Leiber, Stoller)
"Let It Be" (Lennon–McCartney)
"Yesterday" (Lennon–McCartney)
"Hey Jude" (Lennon–McCartney)

Band line-up
Paul McCartney – lead vocals, acoustic, electric and bass guitars, piano
Linda McCartney – backing vocals, keyboards, percussion, autoharp
Hamish Stuart – acoustic and electric guitars, acoustic and electric bass guitars, backing vocals
Robbie McIntosh – acoustic and electric guitars, backing vocals
Paul 'Wix' Wickens – keyboards, accordion, acoustic guitar, percussion, backing vocals
Blair Cunningham – drums, percussion

Charts

Weekly charts
Album release

Certifications
Album release

Video release

References

External links
 

Albums produced by Paul McCartney
Paul McCartney live albums
1993 live albums
Parlophone live albums
Live video albums